Anchabadze, also known as Achba, is a Georgian and Abkhazian family, and the oldest surviving noble house originating in Abkhazia.

History 
The Anchabadze family is supposed to have its roots in the early medieval ruling dynasty of Abasgia. After the break-up of the Kingdom of Georgia in the late 15th century, Abkhazia came under the influence of the Ottoman Empire and Islam, forcing several members of the family into flight to the eastern Georgian lands – Kartli and Kakheti. Thus, they formed two principal branches: the Abkhazian line of the princes Anchabadze and the Kartlian Machabeli. Both of these families were later integrated into the Imperial Russian princely nobility: Machabeli in 1826 and Anchabadze in 1903.  

The descendants of this family have survived in Abkhazia and Tbilisi, and bear the surnames based on the two letter Abkhazian root Ach (Achba) and on the three letter Georgian root Anch (Anchabadze).

Genealogy 
 Kaytuk Giorgi Bey, married to Yelizaveta Hanım;
 Islam Musa Bey, married to Ayşe Hanım;
 Ahmed Rasim Pasha, married firstly to Fatma Neşedil Hanım, an Abkhazian, married secondly to Emine Vuslat Hanım;
 Ahmed Refik Bey, married to Fatıma Hanım;
 Mihri Hanım, married to Müşfik Selami Bey; 
 Enise Hanım, married to Salih Bey Asaf;
 Hale Asaf;
 Refik Hanım;
 Ahmed Süheyil Bey;
 Emel Nazan Hanım;
 Ahmed Melih Bey;
 Nezih Bey, married to Alexandra Sibylle Armgard;
 Ahmed Selman Bey;
 Ahmed Bey, married to Patıma Hanım Eşba;
 Ahmed Sami Pasha, married to Fatıma Hanım Mamleeva, daughter of Ismail Bey Mamleeva;
 Şükrü Bey, married firstly to Rabia Mümtaz Hanım, married secondly to Neşedil Hanım;
 Ahmed Celal Bey, married firstly to Milnigar Hanım, married secondly to Louise Simon;
 Adalet Pevizfelek Hanım;
 Ayşe Mahizer Hanım;
 Fatma Pesend Hanım married to Abdul Hamid II;
 Ömer Pasha, married to Ayşe Kemalifer Hanım, second daughter of Mahmud Bey Dziapş-Ipa, and sister of Dürrünev Kadın;
 Mehmed Refik Bey, married to Emine Maheşref Hanım, daughter of Osman Bey Eymhaa and Hesan Hanım Çaabalurhva;
 Ahmed Bey, married to Esmehan Hanım Geçba, daughter of Eyüb Bey Geçba and Ayşe Gülten Hanım;
 Rifat Kemaleddin Bey;
 Emine Nurbanu Hidayet Hanım, married to Şehzade Mehmed Burhaneddin, son of Abdul Hamid II;
 Leyla Gülefşan Hanım;
 Feride Hanım, married to Hasan Bey Eymhaa;
 Numan Bey;
 Saide Hanım, married to Salih Bey;
 Hürrem Hanım, married to Arif Bey Çaçba;
 Esma Süreyya Cavidan Hanım, married to Şehzade Yusuf Izzeddin;
 Mehmed Bey, married to Şadiye Hanım;
 Behiye Nazmelek Hanım, married to Osman Pasha Zevş-Barakay, brother of Nesrin Neşerek Kadın, wife of Abdülaziz;
 Azize Haletyar Hanım;
 Saliha Verdicenan Kadın, married to Abdulmejid I;
 Peremrüz Hanım;
 Embruvaz Hanım, married to Adredba Bey;

See also 
 List of Georgian princely families

References

Sources 
 
 
 

Noble families of Georgia (country)
Abkhazian nobility
Russian noble families